The Posavac or Posavina, also known as the Croatian Posavac and the Croatian Posavina (or ), is a breed of medium-sized draught horse with a high capacity for weight pulling. Throughout its history, the breed has been popular for pulling wagons. It is also  used for forestry, agricultural and other work.

History 

The breed was developed in Posavina, a region alongside the Sava river in Croatia. It was based on a local Slavonian-Posavian horse breed called bušak (bushak), whose mares were crossbred to quality stallions of other breeds including Arabian, Nonius, Noriker and Percheron.

The majority of Posavina horses are in Croatia, but the breed is also present in Bosnia-Herzegovina and Slovenia, where it is reared principally for meat.

The registered population of Posavina horses in Croatia was estimated at 5131 individuals in 2013., so the breed is considered endangered (FAO classification No. II). The total population in Croatia was reported to DAD-IS as 5800–6000 in 2020. In Slovenia the number was reported as 1910 in 2020.

Characteristics 

It is smaller than two other  Croatian cold-blooded horse breeds, the Međimurje horse (155–165 cm) and Croatian Coldblood (150–160 cm). The Posavina horse may be bay or seal brown, less often black or chestnut; other colours are much more rare.

The head of a Posavina is relatively small, the neck short and muscular, the shoulder deep and broad, the chest wide and deep, and the legs are short and strong, with broad hooves. The breed is known for its easy-going temperament; it is mild and patient, obedient and willing to work hard.

Gallery

See also
 Croatian Coldblood
 Međimurje horse
 List of horse breeds in DAD-IS
 List of mammals of Croatia

References

External links 

Features of Croatian autochthonous cold-blooded horse breeds
 Exterior features of the Posavina horse from the area of the Odra and Lonja field
 Croatian Posavina horse – not only a working animal, but a horse for recreational purposes and therapeutic riding
 Posavina horse – one of the genuine Croatian breeds protected by State Institute for Nature Protection (in Croatian) 
 Endangered horse breeds (FAO)
 Totally 5131 Posavac horses were registered in Croatia in 2013. (in Croatian)

Conservation Priority Breeds of the Livestock Conservancy
Horse breeds
Horse breeds originating in Croatia